The Vanderbilt Law Review is the flagship academic journal of Vanderbilt University Law School.  The law review was founded in 1947 and is published six times per year. In 2018, it was ranked #11 among general-topic law reviews by the Washington and Lee law journal rankings.  Articles appearing in the Vanderbilt Law Review have been cited by the Supreme Court, all thirteen federal circuit courts of appeal, and hundreds of other law reviews and journals. In 2008, the Vanderbilt Law Review launched Vanderbilt Law Review En Banc, an online companion to the law review. En Banc publishes short symposia on Supreme Court cases, responses to articles in the Vanderbilt Law Review, book reviews and comments, and shorter essays on developing topics in legal scholarship.

References

External links 
 

American law journals
Vanderbilt University
General law journals
Law journals edited by students
Publications established in 1947